KGAY may refer to:

 KGAY (AM), a radio station (1270 AM) licensed to serve Thousand Palms, California, United States
 KTMT (AM), a radio station (580 AM) licensed to serve Ashland, Oregon, United States, which held the call sign KGAY from 2008 to 2010